Thongam Tababi Devi is an Indian footballer who plays as a forward. She has been a member of the India women's national team.

International career
Devi capped for India at senior level during the 2012 AFC Women's Olympic Qualifying Tournament.

International goals
Scores and results list India's goal tally first

Other activities
On 2 September 2022, she was elected as a member of the technical committee of the All India Football Federation.

Honours

India
 SAFF Women's Championship: 2010
 South Asian Games Gold medal: 2010

Manipur
 Senior Women's National Football Championship: 1999–00, 2000–01, 2008–09

References 

Living people
Indian women's footballers
Footballers from Manipur
Sportswomen from Manipur
India women's international footballers
Women's association football forwards
South Asian Games gold medalists for India
South Asian Games medalists in football
Year of birth missing (living people)